

List of castles

References

"A Guide to Leicestershire's Castles", The Leicestershire Magazine, October 18, 2010.

Further reading

History of Leicestershire

Castles
Lists of castles in England